The Chetaev instability theorem for dynamical systems states that if there exists, for the system  with an equilibrium point at the origin, a continuously differentiable function V(x) such that
 the origin is a boundary point of the set ;
 there exists a neighborhood  of the origin such that  for all 

then the origin is an unstable equilibrium point of the system.

It is named after Nicolai Gurevich Chetaev.

Applications 
Chetaev instability theorem has been used to analyze the unfolding dynamics of proteins under the effect of optical tweezers.

See also
 Lyapunov function — a function whose existence guarantees stability

References

Further reading

Theorems in dynamical systems
Stability theory